Campbell–Hagerman College was a private, women's college located in Lexington, Kentucky. Affiliated with the Disciples of Christ, the school was founded in 1903. It closed in June 1912.

Beginnings
Barton Campbell Hagerman (1853-1922) had been president of Hamilton College in Lexington, Kentucky from 1898 to 1902. He was supported in this endeavor by his wife, Mary Anna "Mamie" Campbell Hagerman (1862-1912), the granddaughter of Alexander Campbell, founder of the Disciples of Christ or Christian Church, and his second wife Selina Huntington Bakewell Campbell. He worked for a year to build two new buildings on either side of a mansion he planned to turn into a classroom building, and on May 2, 1903, they held an opening ceremony for the new college for women. All the local college presidents and several ministers attended the ceremony and spoke of their support. Hagerman announced that the new college was to be named Campbell-Hagerman College in honor of his wife who would be sharing "in the cares and duties of its conduct."

President Barton C. Hagerman
Barton Campbell Hagerman was from Shelby County, Kentucky and graduated from the Bible College of Kentucky University (now Transylvania University) in June 1874. He then attended Bethany College in West Virginia, graduating in 1876. He stayed there to teach Greek, and he married a Bethany College graduate Mamie Campbell on 11 September 1883. They had two children while living in Bethany, one of whom lived to adulthood: Mary Virginia Hagerman Watson. After attending Hamilton College and then Campbell-Hagerman College, in December 1906, she married a distant relative Dr. Halford Adams Watson of Chicago - also a descendent of Thomas Campbell.

Hagerman brought his family with him to Richmond, Kentucky in 1885 where he served as President of the Madison Female Institute for five years. After a brief respite for health reasons in California, he returned to Kentucky to teach Latin at Kentucky University (now Transylvania University). He was recruited in 1897 to be the sixth president of Bethany College before he was hired a year later as president of Hamilton College the following year. After he left Hamilton College, the suffragist Luella St. Clair Moss became president.

Campus and Curriculum
The campus was located at the north-west edge of the center of Lexington, Kentucky on Second Street - and only four blocks away from his previous institution, Hamilton College. Hagerman built the administrative building to the left of the classroom building, and the dormitory - called Argyle Hall - on the right. The women boarding students and the Hagermans lived there in the top four floors, and in the large basement was the kitchen and cafeteria.

By 1905 the Hagermans had recruited twenty-one teachers. The curriculum included schools of Music, Art, Elocution, Domestic Science, and Business courses. They also offered Gymnasium, tennis, basket ball, and golf. At Commencement that year in the Opera House in Lexington, they graduated thirty-two students.

Closure
The unexpected death of Mamie Hagerman in May 1912 led to a public announcement by her husband that he would not reopen the school in the fall. The announcement explained that the school would be discontinued "on account of the recent death of his wife who actively aided in the direction of the school." Hagerman decided that the two newer buildings would be converted into "residence apartments."

See also
 Bethany College (West Virginia)
 Hamilton College (Kentucky)
 Madison Female Institute
 Kentucky's List of current and historical women's universities and colleges in the U.S.

References

Additional resources

Defunct private universities and colleges in Kentucky
Universities and colleges affiliated with the Christian Church (Disciples of Christ)
Educational institutions established in 1903
Universities and colleges in Lexington, Kentucky
History of women in Kentucky
1903 establishments in Kentucky
Former women's universities and colleges in the United States